Christopher Kalani Cushman Lee (born January 28, 1981) is an American politician and a Democratic member of the Hawaii Senate. He was the youngest member and only millennial serving in the Hawaii State Legislature when elected in November, 2008. He currently serves as Majority Whip and Chairman of the House Judiciary Committee. He also serves on the boards of several non-profit organizations and commissions.

Lee is a supporter of addressing climate change and has authored laws making Hawaii the first state to mandate 100 percent renewable energy by 2045, the first state to commit to economy-wide carbon neutrality by 2045, and the first state requiring all public schools and universities to upgrade and become net-zero facilities by 2035. He is an advocate for equal rights, serving as spokesperson for the campaign to pass the Hawaii Marriage Equality Act in 2013, and authoring two laws protecting transgender individuals.

Lee also successfully helped lead the campaign to expand the Papahanaumokuakea Marine National Monument into the world's largest marine protected area, and successfully led the opposition to defeat a $4.3 billion takeover of Hawaii's electric utilities by Florida-based Nextera Energy.

Early life
Lee was born January 28, 1981, in Honolulu, Hawaii. He graduated in 1999 from Iolani School. Lee graduated with a BA in political science from Oregon State University. Before getting involved in politics he worked at Big Brothers Big Sisters Hawaii, Hawaiian Airlines, and at the Hawaii State Capitol.

Stroke 
At 30 years old, Lee suffered a stroke while speaking at a community meeting. He spent four days in the hospital and over the succeeding months made a full recovery. Lee credits the stroke with "changing everything" for him and causing him to realize his time was short. So he "began standing up to tackle even the most difficult issues, and taking on the political powers that be."

State legislature

Elections 
In 2008, when Democratic State Representative Tommy Waters retired and left the District 51 seat in the House of Representatives open, Lee won the three-way September 20, 2008, Democratic primary against Ikaika Anderson and Shaun Christensen with 2,292 votes (54.0%), and won the November 4, 2008, general election with 5,885 votes (61.9%) against Republican nominee Quentin Kawananakoa.

In 2010, Lee was unopposed for the September 18, 2010, Democratic primary, winning with 4,102 votes, and won the November 2, 2010, general election with 5,626 votes (70.9%) against Republican nominee Maka Wolfgramm.

In 2012, Lee was unopposed for the August 11, 2012, Democratic primary, winning with 5,120 votes, and won the November 6, 2012, general election with 8,550 votes (77.8%) against Republican nominee Henry Vincent.

Political career and positions

Progressive policy leader 
Lee is frequently cited as a progressive policy leader for his work breaking new ground on difficult issues. The Sunrise Movement recognized Lee as likely "the most accomplished climate change legislator in the country." The Progressive Campaign Change Committee included Lee on their political Power List for his "long list of accomplishments" and "helping to build the power of the progressive community." The Honolulu Star-Advertiser noted that "Lee has been effective in shepherding legislation on energy and advancing a range of progressive goals"  These include passing the nation's first legislation committing a state to ensuring basic financial security for all families, the first law requiring utilities to sell 100 percent renewable energy, the first law committing a state to carbon neutrality, the first tax breaks for organic farming, the first laws requiring all public schools and universities to become net-zero facilities, and co-authoring the first law banning the toxic pesticide chlorpyrifos, and the first law banning toxic chemicals in sunscreens. He was also the first elected official to raise the national alarm about widespread harm to vulnerable children and adults resulting from predatory gambling mechanisms in video games. Lee is a supporter of transgender rights.

Winning battles against large corporations and industry influence 
Lee has also received attention for successfully winning several high-profile political battles against multi-billion dollar corporations and industries.

Industrial pesticide companies 
90 percent of all industrial genetically modified corn in the United States is developed in Hawaii, a testing ground for new pesticides. Following reports of aerial pesticide spraying impacting the health of children and families in Hawaii, in 2010 Lee introduced the first of a series of bills to address the business practices of large pesticide companies and their impacts on public health. This bill sought to protect small farmers from lawsuits routinely used by large pesticide companies to intimidate and threaten smaller farmers. Pesticide companies lobbied and killed the bill. Undeterred, Lee began coordinating with community groups and environmental organizations and in subsequent years introducing bills to require disclosure of pesticide use, ban toxic pesticides, establish buffer zones around schools, and establish tax breaks for organic agriculture.

In 2014, while pesticide companies such as Monsanto, Syngenta, and Pioneer Hybrid International battled in court to prevent county regulation of their pesticide operations, and poured millions of dollars into local elections, Lee led his House Committee on Energy and Environmental Protection to conduct public hearings in which he questioned officials about large quantities of unreported pesticides being sprayed around the state and a lack of meaningful oversight to ensure public safety.

In 2015 Lee passed a law to help farmers end their dependence on pesticides sold by large pesticide companies by creating the first tax breaks of up to $50,000 per year for organic farmers.

In 2018 Lee championed legislation and helped negotiate a deal between lawmakers to overcome strong lobbying and opposition by pesticide companies, and pass a law setting a new precedent by making Hawaii the first state to ban the toxic pesticide chlorpyrifos, require disclosure of pesticides being sprayed, and establish 100 foot pesticide buffer zones around all public schools. The following year California, Oregon, New York and Connecticut introduced similar legislation following the success of the ban in Hawaii.

This political battle over pesticide regulation in Hawaii was the subject of a 2019 documentary "Poisoning Paradise" produced by Pierce Brosnan and directed by Keely Shaye Brosnan.

NextEra Energy Inc. 

In 2014 Florida-based NextEra Energy Inc. launched a $4.3 billion bid to acquire Hawaiian Electric Industries, which includes 3 of Hawaii's major electric utilities serving over 90 percent of the state's households. After months of investigation in which it became clear NextEra Energy Inc. may pass an excessive $30 billion in costs to consumers, Lee became the first Legislator to publicly oppose the acquisition because he "must put the best interest of the public first." Lee led the opposition amongst state legislators and county leaders and organized over 40 other elected officials from both parties to collectively announce at a press conference that better alternatives must be sought. Lee pushed legislation to stop the acquisition in the 2016 legislative session, and successfully included $1.2m in the 2016 state budget to examine alternative utility ownership and business models. He continued to coordinate elected officials and public stakeholders at public hearings and in an aggressive earned media campaign opposing the acquisition. At the announcement of the acquisition in December, 2015, public polls showed 32 percent public support for the acquisition. Despite over $20 million in utility advertising, by February, 2016 just 16 percent of the public supported the acquisition. The Public Utilities Commission subsequently rejected the acquisition in July, 2016.

After the defeat of the NextEra Energy Inc. acquisition, the official study to examine alternative utility ownership and business models that better serve consumers began and is now underway. In 2017 Lee authored House Bill 1283, a first-of-its-kind bill to change the electric utilities' business model to ensure utilities better serve the interests of consumers. Known as the Hawaii Ratepayer Protection Act, it required the Public Utilities Commission to "directly tie electric utility revenues to a utility's achievement on performance metrics" such as progress toward integration of renewable energy, customer satisfaction, rate affordability, data sharing with other stakeholders, and interconnection of customer distributed generation. This changes the centralized 20th century business model in which utilities like NextEra Energy Inc automatically profit while passing growing risk and cost on to consumers, in favor of the people these utilities serve. The Hawaii Ratepayer Protection Act passed in 2018 as Senate Bill 2939 and was signed into law as Act 5.

Longline fishing industry and the Papahanaumokuakea Marine National Monument 
Overfishing and other factors have led to the depletion of fish in the Pacific Ocean. In 2016 U.S. Senator Brian Schatz proposed the expansion of the Papahanaumokuakea Marine National Monument to create the world's largest marine protected area encompassing the Northwestern Hawaiian Islands and surrounding waters to ensure protection of this critical habitat.  The commercial fishing industry had organized opposition to new protections for Pacific ocean habitats for some time and began organizing opposition to an expansion of the Papahanaumokuakea Marine National Monument as early as 2014. Throughout 2016 the Western Pacific Regional Fishery Management Council and commercial fishing interests strongly opposed the expansion arguing that it would decrease their catch and profitability. Several former Hawaii Governors and a former U.S. Senator joined a rally in opposition to the expansion.

The 51st House district Lee represents includes the Northwestern Hawaiian Islands and Papahanaumokuakea Marine National Monument. In spite of the heavy industry and political opposition, Lee led grassroots efforts to coordinate environmental organizations and students from schools across the state supporting the monument expansion, testified at public hearings, and organized an earned media campaign supporting additional protections for the endangered habitat. Lee noted that expanding the monument is "a first step that must be taken to make sure we have this incredible valuable resource protected in perpetuity." In a commentary he published in The Hill, Lee argued, "The claim that marine monuments kill jobs and reduce fish catch is not supported by logic or scientific data."

In late August, 2016, President Barack Obama signed an executive order expanding the Papahanaumokuakea Marine National Monument, making it the world's largest marine protected area. Lee joined Obama at the announcement ceremony.

Policy achievements

Renewable energy and climate change 
Lee actively promotes renewable energy and addressing climate change. In 2014 he authored the Hawaii Climate Adaptation Initiative, which established the State of Hawaii's framework to address climate change.

When utilities were accused of blocking homeowners from installing their own rooftop solar panels, Lee convened oversight hearings and passed Act 109, directing the utility to allow customers to install more rooftop solar panels.

In 2015, Lee authored Act 97, which made Hawaii the first state to require all utilities to sell 100 percent renewable energy by 2045. Also that year he authored Act 38, which directs the state to eliminate all fossil fuels for ground transportation. Lee also authored laws in 2015 and 2016 directing all public schools and university campuses to become energy net-zero and generate 100 percent their own renewable power by 2035, and another law creating a green special fund to help the university pay for these upgrades.

Responding to President Trump's withdrawal of the United States from the Paris Agreement in 2017, Lee co-authored Act 32, expanding the Hawaii Climate Adaptation Initiative to include meeting the goals of the Paris Agreement, and authored Act 33, establishing a task force to implement carbon sequestration in the state. Building on the consumer savings seen as a result of Hawaii's tripling of renewable energy between 2007 and 2017, Lee also passed a resolution calling on the federal government and other states to replace fossil fuels with renewable energy.

Lee also authored House Bill 1283, a first-of-its-kind bill to change electric utilities' business models to ensure they better serve the interests of consumers. Known as the Hawaii Ratepayer Protection Act, it required the Public Utilities Commission to "directly tie electric utility revenues to a utility's achievement on performance metrics" such as progress toward integration of renewable energy, customer satisfaction, rate affordability, data sharing with other stakeholders, and interconnection of customer distributed generation. This changes the centralized 20th century business model in which utilities like NextEra automatically profit while passing growing risk and cost on to consumers, in favor of the people which these utilities serve. The Hawaii Ratepayer Protection Act passed in 2018 as Senate Bill 2939 and was signed into law as Act 5.

In 2018, Lee authored and passed Act 15, which made Hawaii the first state legally committing to a zero-emissions clean economy and statewide carbon neutrality by 2045. He also authored Act 17, which ensures all projects prepare for sea level rise by requiring all environmental impact statements to consider its implications.

Since 2015, Lee has worked with policymakers and organized local advocates in other states to help spread policies committing states and cities to 100 percent clean energy and carbon neutrality. Such policies have since been adopted by states such as California, New Mexico, Washington, and New York, among others.

Equal rights and LGBT issues 
Lee has been a strong and consistent advocate on LGBT issues "because all citizens deserve the same benefits and protections of the Constitution," according to his website. He was a strong supporter and spoke out as a newly elected freshman legislator when passing legislation legalizing civil unions in 2009 and 2011. In 2013 while serving in the State Legislature Lee also served as spokesperson for the Hawaii United for Marriage campaign to legalize same-sex marriage in Hawaii. In the midst of the campaign leading up to a legislative special session to decide the issue, Lee received a death threat for his role frequently advocating for same-sex marriage in the media. At the close of a contentious special session in October 2013, the Hawaii legislature passed the Hawaii Marriage Equality Act of 2013. On November 12, Lee delivered remarks on behalf of the House of Representatives at a ceremony in which Governor Neil Abercrombie signed the bill into law, making Hawaii the 15th state to legalize same-sex marriage. "It is never the wrong time to do the right thing," Lee noted in his speech.

In 2015, Lee authored Act 226 allowing transgender individuals to change their birth certificates to reflect their gender identities as recommended by the American Medical Association.  In 2016 he authored Act 135 barring health insurance companies from discriminating against transgender individuals by unfairly denying them medical coverage.

Money in politics and elections 
The US Supreme Court decision in Citizens United v. FEC has allowed billions of dollars of money to flow through superPACs and influence decision makers, according to Lee. In 2009, his first year in office, Lee successfully authored an amendment to House Bill 2003. The amendment prohibited state contractors from making political contributions, helping to prevent what many call a "pay-to-play" culture which exists in politics in many places.

In 2013, Lee authored Act 112 which created a new law requiring superPACs to disclose their top donors in all elections advertising. In 2014, he authored Act 128, which made voter fraud a felony, preventing fraudulent elections advertising which has been used for voter suppression by misdirecting voters to the wrong polling sites or vote on the wrong day. Lee has also been a strong supporter of improving publicly funded elections to ensure all candidates equal voice, and reduce the influence of money in elections, and has supported calls to overturn the Citizens United v. FEC decision.

Other legislation 
Lee has also passed legislation making Hawaii the first state to commit to ensuring basic financial security for all families and begin exploring a guaranteed income for all residents. He passed laws establishing the nation's first tax credits for organic farming. Lee co-authored the first law banning the toxic pesticide chlorpyrifos, and the first law banning toxic chemicals in sunscreens.

In November 2017, Lee, along with Rep. Sean Quinlan, became the first elected officials in the United States to raise concerns about predatory online gaming practices involving loot boxes encouraging minors to gamble after the Star Wars Battlefront II monetization controversy.

References

External links
Official page at the Hawaii State Legislature
Campaign site
 

Place of birth missing (living people)
1981 births
Living people
Democratic Party members of the Hawaii House of Representatives
Oregon State University alumni
21st-century American politicians